Pennsylvania Farm Show Complex & Expo Center, formerly known as State Farm Show Arena, is a large exhibition center and indoor arena in Harrisburg, Pennsylvania. It is primarily used for concerts, agricultural exhibitions, the Pennsylvania Farm Show, and indoor football. The complex also hosts more than 200 other exhibits and trade shows every year.

The complex consists of the following components:
Main Hall, built in 1931
Exposition Hall,  built in 2001
New Holland Arena,  at floor, 7318 seats, completed in 1939 (originally named Large Arena until 2016)
Equine Arena,  at floor, 1660 seats
Sale Arena,  at floor, 918 seats

The North, Northeast, Northwest and West Halls add another  of space.  A large equine barn serves the Equine Arena.

History
In 1921, the State Fair Commission was created to find a site for a new venue to house the increasingly popular Pennsylvania Farm Show, but was replaced in 1927 with the State Farm Products Show Commission. This commission would approve the 40-acre tract north of Harrisburg and later the design by Lawrie & Green for the initial building, with ground being broken by October 31, 1930.

During World War II, the building was used as a training center for the New Cumberland Air Command, with mechanics bays under the North Hall.

The Pennsylvania Farm Show Complex & Expo Center hosted the Harrisburg Heat of the Major Indoor Soccer League from 1991–2003, and the Harrisburg Hammerheads of the Continental Basketball Association from 1994-1995. In 2009, the Pennsylvania Farm Show Complex & Expo Center began hosting the Harrisburg Stampede of the American Indoor Football Association, continuing to do so until 2013 after which the team joined the Professional Indoor Football League and moved to the Giant Center in nearby Hershey. The Central Penn Capitals played at the Expo Center as a member of American Indoor Football in 2016. In 2012, the Harrisburg Heat of the Major Arena Soccer League returned to the Pennsylvania Farm Show Complex & Expo Center to play their home games in the Equine Arena. The team returned to the New Holland Arena beginning with its 2014–15 season. Boxing matches and monster truck rallies have also been held at the venue.

In 2020 and 2021, the Farm Show Complex housed Pennsylvania's stockpile of personal protective equipment related to the COVID-19 pandemic. The state leased private warehouse space for the medical supplies in July 2021, freeing up the complex for events. During the 2020-2021 hiatus, $21 million were spent to renovate the complex with improvements in public safety, sustainability, and energy-efficiency.

Annual events held at the Farm Show Complex
 Pennsylvania Farm Show (January), largest indoor agricultural event held in the United States
 Pennsylvania Auto Show (January)
 Great American Outdoor Show, formerly Eastern Sports and Outdoor Show (February), the world's largest outdoor recreation show and expo
 Pennsylvania National Horse Show (October)
 All American Dairy Show (September)
 Keystone International Livestock Exposition (October)
 PRCA First Frontier Circuit Finals Rodeo (January)
 Motorama Races and Events (February)

References

External links
SAH Archipedia Building Entry

Buildings and structures in Harrisburg, Pennsylvania
Sports venues in Harrisburg, Pennsylvania
Sports in Harrisburg, Pennsylvania
Sports venues in Pennsylvania
Government of Pennsylvania
1931 establishments in Pennsylvania
Indoor soccer venues in the United States
Basketball venues in Pennsylvania
Boxing venues in Pennsylvania
Convention centers in Pennsylvania
Continental Basketball Association venues
Indoor arenas in Pennsylvania
Fairgrounds in the United States